In enzymology, a luteolin-7-O-glucuronide 2"-O-glucuronosyltransferase is an enzyme that catalyzes the chemical reaction

UDP-glucuronate + luteolin 7-O-beta-D-glucuronide  UDP + luteolin 7-O-[beta-D-glucuronosyl-(1→2)-beta-D-glucuronide]

Thus, the two substrates of this enzyme are UDP-glucuronate and luteolin 7-O-beta-D-glucuronide, whereas its two products are UDP and luteolin 7-O-(beta-D-glucuronosyl-(1→2)-beta-D-glucuronide).

This enzyme belongs to the family of glycosyltransferases, specifically the hexosyltransferases.  The systematic name of this enzyme class is UDP-glucuronate:luteolin-7-O-beta-D-glucuronide 2''-O-glucuronosyltransferase. Other names in common use include uridine diphosphoglucuronate-luteolin 7-O-glucuronide, glucuronosyltransferase, LMT, and UDP-glucuronate:luteolin 7-O-glucuronide-glucuronosyltransferase.

References 

 
 

EC 2.4.1
Enzymes of unknown structure